"The Honeydripper" is a 1945 R&B song written by Joe Liggins.

The Honeydripper may also refer to:
The Honeydripper (Roosevelt Sykes album), 1960
The Honeydripper (Jack McDuff album), 1961
Roosevelt Sykes (1906–1983), American blues musician

See also
 Honeydripper (film)
 The Honey Drippers (disambiguation)